Tabooba is a rural locality in the Scenic Rim Region, Queensland, Australia.

Geography 
Tabooba is located at the confluence of Christmas Creek and Logan River.  Logan River marks the western boundary.  In the east the locality reaches elevations greater than 400 m above sea level, along Jinbroken Range.

History
The Beaudesert Shire Tramway passed through Tabooba and opened in 1902.  The station was known as Tabooba Junction.  Here the line split with one branch reaching Rathdowney and the other to Lamington.

Tabooba State School opened on 24 July 1911 and closed on 24 August 1942.

See also
 List of tramways in Queensland

References

Scenic Rim Region
Localities in Queensland